Cogswell may refer to:

Cogswell (surname)
Cogswell, North Dakota, a city in Sargent County
Cogswell Polytechnical College, San Jose, California
Cogswell's Regiment of Militia, a Massachusetts militia from 1775 to 1777
Cogswell Tower, Nova Scotia
Henry Cogswell College, Everett, Washington
USS Cogswell (DD-651), a destroyer
Spencer Cogswell, a character in the American animated series The Jetsons